Samuel Duane Bachman (born September 30, 1999) is an American baseball pitcher for the Los Angeles Angels organization. He played college baseball for the Miami RedHawks. He was selected in the first round of the 2021 Major League Baseball draft by the Angels.

Amateur career
Bachman grew up in Fishers, Indiana and attended Hamilton Southeastern High School.

Bachman entered the Miami RedHawks' starting rotation going into his freshman season and went 7–1 with 3.93 ERA and 75 strikeouts in  innings pitched. His average fastball increased during his college career from 91 miles per hour to over 100 miles per hour.  Bachman had an 3.42 ERA with 31 strikeouts in  innings pitched before the season was cut short due to the coronavirus pandemic. Bachman was projected to be a first round selection in the 2021 Major League Baseball draft going into his junior season. Bachman went 4-4 in his junior season with a 1.81 ERA and 93 strikeouts in  innings pitched and was named first team All-MAC.

Professional career
Bachman was selected ninth overall in the 2021 Major League Baseball draft by the Los Angeles Angels. On July 21, 2021, he signed with the Angels for a $3.85 million bonus. Bachman was assigned to the High-A Tri-City Dust Devils to start his professional career. Over  innings, he went 0-2 with a 3.77 ERA and 15 strikeouts.

References

External links

Miami RedHawks bio

1999 births
Living people
Baseball players from Indianapolis
Baseball pitchers
Miami RedHawks baseball players
Tri-City Dust Devils players
Rocket City Trash Pandas players